Vera Vasilyevna Zorina (real surname Popova; 1853 - 1903) was a Russian operetta singer (mezzo-soprano), best known as a Russian romances (or 'Gypsy art-songs') performer. She became famous after playing the part of Stesha in the popular musical Gypsy Songs in Characters by Nikolai Kulikov. Another highly popular part of hers was La Périchole in the Jacques Offenbach's operetta. Vera Zorina (an ethnic Russian) is regarded as a founder of the "Gypsyan line" in Russian operetta.

References 

19th-century women opera singers from the Russian Empire
1853 births
1903 deaths
Russian mezzo-sopranos